Ants Oidermaa (born Hans Oidermann; 2 December 1891 in Sauga Parish (now Tori Parish), Kreis Pernau – 2 July 1941 in Tallinn) was an Estonian politician, diplomat and newspaper editor.

From 1939 until 1940 he was minister without portfolio, acting as Head of State Propaganda Administration. He was arrested by Soviet occupation authorities in December 1940 in Aegviidu and executed while held in prison in Tallinn.

References

1891 births
1941 deaths
People from Tori Parish
People from Kreis Pernau
Patriotic League (Estonia) politicians
Government ministers of Estonia
Members of the Estonian National Assembly
Members of the Riigivolikogu
Estonian diplomats
Estonian editors
Saint Petersburg State University alumni
Russian military personnel of World War I
White movement people
Recipients of the Order of the White Star, 2nd Class
Estonian people executed by the Soviet Union